Kress Corporation is an American off-road truck manufacturer located in Brimfield, Illinois. Founded in 1965 by Ted Kress, the company has been a manufacturer of specialized industrial equipment for transporting and handling steel, slag, coal and other heavy materials for the steel mills, for the mining industry, and also for earth moving.  His father joined the company in 1969.

The company's first product was a slag pot carrier that was used to pick up, transfer, pour and skull slag pots from blast furnaces. It later expanded into the manufacture of coal haulers and slab carriers used to pick up and carried 100 tons of steel slabs and coils.

References

External links
 Kress Corp Official Page

Companies based in Peoria County, Illinois
Truck manufacturers of the United States
Manufacturing companies based in Illinois